Guanlan River is a tributary of the Shima River located in both cities of Dongguan and Shenzhen. Guanlan River rises in Da'naoke Hill, north of Shenzhen, and flows generally north through Qinghu Village and Guanlan Subdistrict, to Dongguan, then flows north to join Shima River in Yantian Stream, where it feeds into Dong River, about  near Qiaotou Town.

Tributaries
The river's has five major tributaries, the Dalang Stream, Minzhi Stream, Zhangkengjing Stream, Niuhu Stream, and Baihua Stream.

Environmental concerns 
Across the area, millions of tons of raw life sewage, industrial waste and fertilizer runoff disposal contribute to the severe pollution of the Guanlan River.

References

Rivers of Shenzhen
Rivers of Dongguan